Vineland is a city in Cumberland County, in the U.S. state of New Jersey. Bridgeton and Vineland are the two principal cities of the Vineland-Bridgeton metropolitan statistical area, which encompasses those cities and all of Cumberland County for statistical purposes and which constitutes a part of the Delaware Valley (the Philadelphia metro area). The MSA had a population of 156,898 as of the 2010 census. As of the 2020 United States census, the city's population was 60,780, an increase of 56 (+.1%) from the 2010 census count of 60,724, which in turn reflected an increase of 4,453 (+7.9%) from the 56,271 counted in the 2000 census. The Census Bureau's Population Estimates Program calculated that the city's population was 61,156 in 2021, ranking the city the 630th-most-populous in the country.

Vineland was formed on July 1, 1952, through the merger of Landis Township and Vineland Borough, based on the results of a referendum held on February 5, 1952. Festivities on July 1, 1952, when the merger took effect, included a parade and speeches from such notables as Senator Estes Kefauver. The name is derived from the plans of its founder to use the land to grow grapes.

Geographically, the city is part of the South Jersey. It has large Italian-American and Hispanic-American populations.

History
Charles K. Landis purchased  of land in 1861 and another  in 1874, near Millville, and along the West Jersey railroad line with service between Camden and Cape May, to create his own alcohol-free utopian society based on agriculture and progressive thinking. The first houses were built in 1862, and train service was established to Philadelphia and New York City, with the population reaching 5,500 by 1865 and 11,000 by 1875.

Vineland was an early temperance town, where the sale of alcohol was prohibited. Landis required that buyers of land in Vineland build a house on the purchased property within a year of acquisition, that  of the often heavily wooded land be cleared and farmed each year, and that adequate space be placed between houses and roads to allow for planting of flowers and shade trees along the routes through town.

After determining that the Vineland soil was well-suited for growing grapes (hence the name), Landis started advertising to attract Italian grape growers to Vineland, offering  of land that had to be cleared and used to grow grapes. Thomas Bramwell Welch founded Welch's Grape Juice, and purchased the locally grown grapes to make "unfermented wine" (i.e. grape juice). The fertile ground also attracted the glass-making industry and was home to the Progresso soup company. Throughout the first half of the 20th century, most of the city was involved in the poultry industry, which led to the city being dubbed "The Egg Basket of America."

Vineland Poultry Laboratories was started by Arthur Goldhaft. Dr. Goldhaft is credited with putting "a chicken in every pot" after developing the fowl pox chicken vaccine that saved millions of chickens from death. Dr. Goldhaft's work at Vineland Poultry Laboratories in Vineland helped protect the world's chicken supply from the fowl pox disease. Operations at the facility were closed by Lohmann Animal Health in 2007.

Vineland had New Jersey's first school for the intellectually disabled, the Vineland Developmental Center, which now has an east and west campus. These institutions housed mentally handicapped women in fully staffed cottages. Henry H. Goddard, an American psychologist, coined the term "Moron" while directing the Research Laboratory at the Training School for Backward and Feeble-minded Children in Vineland. This facility was so sufficiently well known that one American Prison Association pamphlet in 1955 heralded Vineland as "famous for its contributions to our knowledge of the feebleminded".

Vineland celebrated its 150th birthday in 2011. Mayor Robert Romano initially ordered a custom cake from Buddy Valastro of Carlo's Bake Shop in Hoboken; the business is featured in the TLC reality television series Cake Boss. After outcry from local business owners, the order was canceled and five Vineland bakeries donated elaborate cakes for the event as well as over 1,000 servings of cake for the celebration.

Since the 1970s, the city has had an annual dandelion festival. Brought to the area by early Italian immigrants, the plant is grown as a crop by farms in Vineland.

Barbara Kingsolver's 2018 novel Unsheltered is set in Vineland.

Geography
According to the U.S. Census Bureau, the city had a total area of 68.99 square miles (178.68 km2), including 68.39 square miles (177.14 km2) of land and 0.60 square miles (1.54 km2) of water (0.86%). Of all the municipalities in New Jersey to hold the type of City, Vineland is the largest in total area. (Hamilton Township in Atlantic County is the largest municipality in New Jersey in terms of land area. Galloway Township, also in Atlantic County, is the largest municipality in total area, including open water within its borders.)

Unincorporated communities, localities and place names located partially or completely within the city include Clayville, Hances Bridge, Leamings Mill, Menantico, North Vineland, Parvins Branch, South Vineland, Willow Grove and Pleasantville. That last community (adjacent to Newfield Boro) is not to be confused with the City of Pleasantville in Atlantic County.

Vineland borders the municipalities of Deerfield Township, Millville, and Maurice River Township in Cumberland County; Buena and Buena Vista Township in Atlantic County; Franklin Township and Newfield Boro in Gloucester County; and Pittsgrove Township in Salem County.

Demographics

2010 census

The Census Bureau's 2006–2010 American Community Survey showed that (in 2010 inflation-adjusted dollars) median household income was $54,024 (with a margin of error of +/− $2,798) and the median family income was $64,185 (+/− $2,216). Males had a median income of $48,974 (+/− $1,402) versus $35,513 (+/− $2,565) for females. The per capita income for the city was $24,512 (+/− $895). About 11.0% of families and 12.8% of the population were below the poverty line, including 19.0% of those under age 18 and 9.1% of those age 65 or over.

2000 census
As of the 2000 U.S. census, there were 56,271 people, 19,930 households, and 14,210 families residing in the city. The racial makeup of the city was 67.47% White, 13.62% African American, 0.54% Native American, 1.16% Asian, 0.08% Pacific Islander, 14.01% from other races, and 3.13% from two or more races. Hispanic or Latino of any race were 30.00% of the population.

There were 19,939 households, out of which 80.9% had children under the age of 18 living with them, 48.8% were married couples living together, 16.8% had a female householder with no husband present, and 28.7% were non-families. 23.7% of all households were made up of individuals, and 11.2% had someone living alone who was 65 years of age or older. The average household size was 2.70 and the average family size was 3.17.

In the city the population was spread out, with 25.7% under the age of 18, 8.3% from 18 to 24, 29.0% from 25 to 44, 22.9% from 45 to 64, and 14.2% who were 65 years of age or older. The median age was 36 years. For every 100 females, there were 92.0 males. For every 100 females age 18 and over, there were 86.9 males.

The median income for a household in the city was $40,076, and the median income for a family was $47,909. Males had a median income of $35,195 versus $25,518 for females. The per capita income for the city was $18,797. About 9.8% of families and 13.8% of the population were below the poverty line, including 17.3% of those under age 18 and 13.8% of those age 65 or over.

Economy

Portions of the city are part of a joint Urban Enterprise Zone (UEZ) with Millville, one of 32 zones covering 37 municipalities statewide. Millville was selected in 1983 as one of the initial group of 10 zones chosen to participate in the program. In addition to other benefits to encourage employment and investment within the Zone, shoppers can take advantage of a reduced 3.3125% sales tax rate (half of the % rate charged statewide) at eligible merchants. Established in October 1988, the city's Urban Enterprise Zone status expires in December 2023.

The main street in Vineland is Landis Avenue. The traditional downtown area is located several blocks east and west of the intersection of Landis Avenue and the Boulevard. The Boulevard is a pair of roads that flank the main north–south railroad, which connected Vineland with Cape May to the south and Camden/Philadelphia to the north. After many years of decline, there has been much recent activity to restore the vitality of "The Avenue" and the center city area. New construction includes a new transportation center, courthouse, post office, elementary school / community center and sidewalk upgrades. In 2005, Vineland was designated a Main Street Community and, through the work of this group, money has been earmarked to continue this improvement through property and facade improvements, business retention and marketing.

Government

Local government
The City of Vineland is governed within the Faulkner Act, formally known as the Optional Municipal Charter Law, under the Mayor-Council (Plan A), implemented based on the recommendations of a Charter Study Commission as of July 1, 1952, months after the city's formation. The city is one of 71 municipalities (of the 564) statewide that use this form of government. The governing body is a mayor, serving as the city's chief executive, and a five-member city council, serving as the city's legislature. The mayor and council are elected at-large to serve concurrent four-year terms of office in non-partisan elections held in leap years as part of the November general election. An ordinance passed by the council in 2011 shifted elections from May to November, effectively extending the term of those members serving at the time by six months.

, the mayor of Vineland is Anthony Fanucci whose term of office ends on December 31, 2024. Members of the Vineland city council are Council President Elizabeth Arthur, Council Vice President David Acosta, Ronald John Franceschini Jr., Paul F. Spinelli and Albert Vargas, all of whom serving terms of office ending on December 31, 2024.

In November 2019, the city council appointed Elizabeth Arthur to fill the seat vacated by Angela Calakos following her resignation after announcing that she was moving out of the city. Arthur served on an interim basis until the November 2019 general election, when she was elected to serve the balance of the term office.

In January 2013, Ruben Bermudez took office as the city's first Hispanic mayor.

Federal, state and county representation
Vineland is located in the 2nd Congressional District and is part of New Jersey's 1st state legislative district.

Politics
As of March 2011, there were a total of 37,583 registered voters in Vineland, of which 10,388 (27.6%) were registered as Democrats, 6,109 (16.3%) were registered as Republicans and 21,059 (56.0%) were registered as Unaffiliated. There were 27 voters registered to other parties.

In the 2012 presidential election, Democrat Barack Obama received 64.9% of the vote (15,299 cast), ahead of Republican Mitt Romney with 34.2% (8,074 votes), and other candidates with 0.9% (218 votes), among the 23,880 ballots cast by the city's 39,605 registered voters (289 ballots were spoiled), for a turnout of 60.3%. In the 2008 presidential election, Democrat Barack Obama received 62.6% of the vote (15,743 cast), ahead of Republican John McCain, who received 35.2% (8,862 votes), with 25,144 ballots cast among the city's 39,098 registered voters, for a turnout of 64.3%. In the 2004 presidential election, Democrat John Kerry received 53.8% of the vote (12,506 ballots cast), outpolling Republican George W. Bush, who received around 43.6% (10,131 votes), with 23,253 ballots cast among the city's 35,943 registered voters, for a turnout percentage of 64.7.

In the 2013 gubernatorial election, Republican Chris Christie received 55.5% of the vote (7,171 cast), ahead of Democrat Barbara Buono with 42.8% (5,527 votes), and other candidates with 1.7% (221 votes), among the 13,243 ballots cast by the city's 37,789 registered voters (324 ballots were spoiled), for a turnout of 35.0%. In the 2009 gubernatorial election, Democrat Jon Corzine received 52.2% of the vote (7,457 ballots cast), ahead of both Republican Chris Christie with 40.1% (5,725 votes) and Independent Chris Daggett with 4.8% (681 votes), with 14,289 ballots cast among the city's 37,092 registered voters, yielding a 38.5% turnout.

Education

Primary and secondary
The Vineland Public Schools serves students in public school for pre-kindergarten through twelfth grade. The district is one of 31 former Abbott districts statewide that were established pursuant to the decision by the New Jersey Supreme Court in Abbott v. Burke which are now referred to as "SDA Districts" based on the requirement for the state to cover all costs for school building and renovation projects in these districts under the supervision of the New Jersey Schools Development Authority. As of the 2020–21 school year, the district, comprised of 14 schools, had an enrollment of 10,266 students and 731.9 classroom teachers (on an FTE basis), for a student–teacher ratio of 14.0:1. Schools in the district (with 2020–21 enrollment data from the National Center for Education Statistics) are 
Casimer M. Dallago Jr. Preschool Center / IMPACT (with 215 students; in grade Pre-K), 
Dane Barse Elementary School (264; K–5), 
Solve D'Ippolito Elementary School (474; K–5), 
Marie Durand School (496; K–5), 
Edward Johnstone School (183; 5–8), 
Dr. William Mennies Elementary School (596; K–5), 
Pauline J. Petway Elementary School (504; K–5), 
Anthony Rossi Elementary School (637; K–5), 
Gloria M. Sabater Elementary School (784; K–5), 
Dr. John H. Winslow Elementary School (462; K–5), 
Sgt. Dominick Pilla Middle School (682; 6–8), 
Veterans Memorial Middle School (818; 6–8), 
Thomas W. Wallace Jr. Middle School (783; 6–8), 
Cunningham Academy for students with "personal or academic challenges that prevent them from reaching their full potential" (NA; 7–12) and 
Vineland High School (2,589; 9–12).

Students are also eligible to attend Cumberland County Technology Education Center in Millville (with a Vineland post office address), serving students from the entire county in its full-time technical training programs, which are offered without charge to students who are county residents. The school relocated starting in the 2016–17 school year to a  campus in Vineland constructed at a cost of $70 million and located next to Cumberland County College. The school initiated a new full-time high school program that included 240 students who will be part of the initial graduating class of 2020.

Cumberland Christian School is a private coeducational day school located in Vineland, serving students in pre-kindergarten through twelfth grade. The school, founded in 1946, has a total enrollment of over 1,000 students.

The city is home to two Catholic elementary schools, Bishop Schad Regional School (combining St. Francis and Sacred Heart Schools) and St. Mary Regional School. Both schools operate under the supervision of the Roman Catholic Diocese of Camden. Bishop Schad formed in 2007 from the merger of Sacred Heart Regional School (Sacred Heart/St. Isidore) and St. Francis of Assisi, using the Sacred Heart site. Sacred Heart High School served grades 9–12 from 1927 until its closure by the Camden Diocese in June 2013 due to declining enrollment. St. Joseph High School in Hammonton was the closest Catholic high school. However that school closed in 2020.

The Ellison School was a private, nonsectarian coeducational Pre-K–8 day school located on South Spring Road in Vineland. The school was founded in 1959 as a grade 1–3 school, and moved to its current site in 1968. By 2016 enrollment had dropped to the point where closure was considered. By late 2019 the school had 11 instructors, three assistants to the instructors, and 76 students. Ellison closed in December 2019. 25 of the students moved to the Pre-K–8 Christian school Edgarton Christian Academy, then in Newfield, which planned to move to Buena.

College
Rowan College of South Jersey Cumberland Campus (former Cumberland County College) is partially in the Vineland city limits with the other portion in Millville.

Library
Vineland Public Library (VPL) is the city's public library.

Points of interest
 The Delsea Drive-In, located on Route 47 (Delsea Drive) north of County Route 552, was for years the only remaining drive-in theater in the state of New Jersey, the state in which they were first created in 1932 in Camden. Today New Jersey is home to two drive-in theaters—the Delsea Drive-In and the Newark Moonlight Cinema.
 The Palace of Depression was built by the mustachioed eccentric George Daynor, a former Alaska gold miner who lost his fortune in the Wall Street Crash of 1929; the house was known as "The Strangest House in the World" or the "Home of Junk", and was built as a testament of willpower against the effects of the Great Depression.  a full restoration, undertaken by The Palace of Depression Restoration Association, is ongoing.
 The Landis MarketPlace opened in 2011 as a two-level indoor public market and would go on to include several vendors on the upper level. In July 2015, the Amish vendors on the lower level departed and the market was purchased by the city the following month.  Spataro's Pizza was the sole remaining tenant.
 The Vineland Historical and Antiquarian Society, a museum and research library that has been in operation since 1910 and holds a large collection exhibiting the city's history.
 In 2009, as much as $25 million in grants from the Economic Stimulus Act of 2008 were allocated to help with the cleanup of the Vineland Chemical Company site. The company's owners had paid $3 million towards the cleanup of soil and water at the site polluted with arsenic and other toxic materials, though the United States Environmental Protection Agency has spent more than $120 million to remediate the Superfund site.

Media
Clear Communications owns two locally licensed radio stations; WVLT (92.1) and WMIZ (1270), with WPOV-LP (107.7) owned by the local branch of Calvary Chapel. Vineland is also the city of license for WUVP-DT (channel 65), Philadelphia's Univision station, which has studios in Franklin Township and their news operation and transmitter based in Philadelphia proper.

Transportation

Roads and highways

Route 56 (Landis Avenue) heads across the city from Pittsgrove Township to its eastern terminus at Route 47.

County Route 552 (Sherman Avenue / Mays Landing Road) enters from Deerfield Township in the city's southwest corner and continues for  into Maurice River Township. County Route 555 (South Main Road / North Main Road) enters from Millville extending for  into Franklin Township.

Public transportation
NJ Transit provides bus transportation on the 313 route between Cape May and Philadelphia, on the 408 route between Millville and Philadelphia and on the 553 route between Upper Deerfield Township and Atlantic City.

Two general aviation airports are located nearby.

Parks and recreation
The Cumberland Cape Atlantic YMCA is in Vineland. The corporate name was changed from Vineland YMCA as the board of directors decided to expand the organization's service area to Atlantic County and Cape May County. There was a previous YMCA building in Millville that in August 1990 stopped operations. In late 1997 Millville Housing Authority purchased the building, which opened as the Holly City Development Corp. Family Center in 2001.

Notable people

People who were born in, residents of, or otherwise closely associated with Vineland include:

 Hakeem Abdul-Shaheed (born 1959), convicted drug dealer and organized crime leader
 Nelson Albano (born 1954), member of the New Jersey General Assembly who has represented the 1st Legislative District
 Nicholas Asselta (born 1951), member of the New Jersey Senate, who served on the Vineland Board of Education (1993–1996), Vineland Planning Board (1992–1993) and Vineland Environmental Commission (1992–1993)
 Johnny Austin (1910–1983), trumpeter who played with the Glenn Miller Orchestra before forming the Johnny Austin Orchestra in 1947
 Herman Bank (1916–2012), mechanical engineer at the Jet Propulsion Laboratory who oversaw the design of several early spacecraft
 Wallace M. Beakley (1903–1975), naval aviator who was a vice admiral in the United States Navy
 Obie Bermúdez (born 1977), Latin Grammy winner for Best Male Pop Vocal Album in 2005
 Stanley Brotman (1924–2014), Judge of the United States District Court for the District of New Jersey
 Robert Neil Butler (1927–2010), first director of the National Institute on Aging
 Glenn Carbonara (born 1966), former professional soccer player
 Thomas Chisholm (1866–1960), Christian songwriter who wrote Great Is Thy Faithfulness
 Jamil Demby (born 1996), offensive tackle on the practice squad of the Los Angeles Rams of the NFL
 Dick Errickson (1912–1999), pitcher who played in MLB for the Boston Bees / Braves and the Chicago Cubs
 Sam Fiocchi (born 1952), member of the New Jersey General Assembly from the 1st Legislative District from 2014 to 2016
 Darren Ford (born 1985), MLB outfielder who played for the San Francisco Giants
 Ted Ford (born 1947), former MLB outfielder who played for the Cleveland Indians and Texas Rangers
 Chris Gheysens (born ), president and chief executive officer of Wawa Inc.
 Henry H. Goddard (1866–1957), psychologist and eugenicist and author of The Kallikak Family, who headed the Vineland Training School for Feeble-Minded Girls and Boys, where he introduced the term "moron" to describe a mild form of mental retardation
 Jeremiah Hacker (1801–1895), Quaker reformer and journalist
 Lee Hull (born 1965), football coach and former player who was the head football coach at Morgan State University from 2014 to 2015
 Alan Kotok (1941–2006), computer scientist known for his early and significant contributions to the Internet and World Wide Web
 R. Bruce Land (born 1950), politician and former corrections officer who has represented the 1st Legislative District in the New Jersey General Assembly since 2016
 Charles K. Landis (1833–1900), founder of Vineland
 Layle Lane (1893–1976), African American educator and civil rights activist
 Miles Lerman (1920–2008), Holocaust survivor who fought as a Jewish resistance fighter during World War II in Nazi occupied Poland and helped to plan and create the United States Holocaust Memorial Museum in Washington, D.C.
 Matthew Lipman (1923–2010), founder of Philosophy for Children
 Jillian Loyden (born 1985), soccer goalkeeper
 Fred Lucas (1903–1987), MLB outfielder who played briefly for the Philadelphia Phillies during the 1935 season
 Soraida Martinez (born 1956), artist, designer and social activist known for creating the art style of Verdadism
 John Landis Mason (1832–1902), inventor of the Mason jar
 Matthew W. Milam (born 1961), politician who served in the New Jersey General Assembly from 2008 to 2013
 Liv Lux Miyake-Mugler, drag performer most known for competing on season 13 of RuPaul's Drag Race
 Don Money (born 1947), professional baseball player
 Ryan Ogren (born 2000), musician who has performed as part of Over It and Runner Runner
 Isiah Pacheco (born 2000), American football running back for the Kansas City Chiefs
 John Pascarella (born 1966), soccer coach who serves as head coach of USL Championship club OKC Energy FC
 Lou Piccone (born 1949), wide receiver and kick returner who played in the NFL for the New York Jets and Buffalo Bills, during his nine seasons in the league
 James Louis Schad (1917–2002), auxiliary bishop of the Roman Catholic Diocese of Camden from 1966 to 1993
 Jeret Schroeder (born 1969), former driver in the Indy Racing League
 Chad Severs (born 1982), professional soccer player
 Walter H. Seward (1896–2008), supercentenarian who was, at the time of his death at the age of 111, the third-oldest verified man living in the United States
 Walter L. Shaw (1916–1996), telecommunications engineer and inventor who ended up supplying the Mafia with black boxes capable of making free and untraceable telephone calls
 George H. Stanger (1902–1958), politician who served in the New Jersey Senate from 1938 to 1946
 Young Steff (born 1988), R&B, Hip Hop, and Pop singer-songwriter
 Marc Stern, attorney, business executive and philanthropist who serves as the chairman of the TCW Group
 Muriel Streeter (1913–1995), artist known for her surrealist paintings
 Mary Treat (1830–1923), naturalist/botanist and correspondent with Charles Darwin, who was the author of Injurious Insects of the Farm and Field (1882)
 Gina Thompson (born 1973), R&B singer whose song "The Things That You Do" peaked at number 41 on the Billboard Hot 100 charts, and number 12 on Billboard's Hot R&B/Hip-Hop Singles & Tracks Chart
 Mike Trout (born 1991), Major League Baseball outfielder was born in Vineland
 Richard Veenfliet (1843–1922), painter
 Vic Voltaggio (born 1941), Major League Baseball umpire from 1977 to 1996
 John H. Ware III (1908–1997), member of the United States House of Representatives from Pennsylvania
 Anthony Watson (born 1989), American-born skeleton racer who competed on behalf of Jamaica in the 2018 Winter Olympics, becoming the first athlete to represent the Caribbean nation in the winter sport
 Mona Weissmark, psychologist who has focused on intergenerational justice
 Thomas Bramwell Welch (1825–1903), discoverer of the pasteurization process to prevent the fermentation of grape juice
 Elmer H. Wene (1892–1957), represented  from 1937 to 1939 and from 1941 to 1945
 Freda L. Wolfson (born 1954), District Judge for the United States District Court for the District of New Jersey
 Clarence M. York (1867–1906), attorney who served as a law clerk to the justices of the Supreme Court of the United States

References

External links

 Vineland website
 Vineland Historical and Antiquarian Society
 

 
1952 establishments in New Jersey
Cities in Cumberland County, New Jersey
Faulkner Act (mayor–council)
New Jersey Urban Enterprise Zones
Populated places established in 1952
Ukrainian communities in the United States